Luciano Bianciardi (14 December 1922 – 14 November 1971) was an Italian journalist, translator and writer of short stories and novels.

He contributed significantly to the cultural ferment in post-war Italy, working actively with various publishing houses, magazines and newspapers. His work is characterized by periods of rebellion against the cultural establishment, to which he also belonged, and by a careful analysis of social habits during Italian economic miracle.

He was the first Italian translator of Henry Miller's Tropic of Cancer and Tropic of Capricorn, Saul Bellow's Henderson the Rain King, John Steinbeck's The Winter of Our Discontent and Travels with Charley, Jack London's John Barleycorn, J.P. Donleavy's The Ginger Man and William Faulkner's A Fable and The Mansion.

Among the others, he also translated: Stephen Crane's Maggie and The Red Badge of Courage, Fred Hoyle's The Black Cloud, Osamu Dazai's The Setting Sun, Cyril Northcote Parkinson's Parkinson's Law, Mary Renault's The King Must Die, Brendan Behan's Borstal Boy, Irwin Shaw's Tip on a Dead Jockey, Aldous Huxley's Brave New World Revisited, Richard Brautigan's A Confederate General from Big Sur, Thomas Berger's Little Big Man and Killing Time.

Works

Novels
Il lavoro culturale (Cultural Work), 1957.
L'integrazione (Integration), 1960.
Da Quarto a Torino (From Quarto to Turin), 1960.
La vita agra (It's a Hard Life), 1962.
La battaglia soda (The Firm Battle), 1964.
Dághela avanti un passo! (Come on, a Step Forward!), 1969.
Aprire il fuoco (Open Fire), 1969.
Garibaldi (Garibaldi), 1972.

English editions
La vita agra: or, It's a Hard Life, Hodder & Stoughton, London, 1965; translation by Eric Mosbacher.
La vita agra. It's a Hard Life, Viking Press, New York, 1965; translation by Eric Mosbacher.

Essays
I minatori della Maremma (The Miners of the Maremma), with Carlo Cassola, 1956.
Viaggio in Barberia (A Trip to Barbary), 1969.

Latter collections

Short stories
Il Peripatetico e altre storie (The Peripatetic and other stories), Rizzoli, 1976.
La solita zuppa e altre storie (The Same Old Soup and other stories), Bompiani, 1994.

Journalistic collections
Chiese escatollo e nessuno raddoppiò, Baldini&Castoldi, 1995.
L'alibi del progresso, ExCogita, 2000.
Un volo e una canzone, ExCogita, 2002.
Il fuorigioco mi sta antipatico, Stampa Alternativa, 2006.
Il convitato di vetro - "Telebianciardi", ExCogita, 2007.
Non leggete i libri, fateveli raccontare. Sei lezioni per diventare un intellettuale dedicate in particolare ai giovani privi di talento, Stampa Alternativa, 2008.

Complete works
 L'antimeridiano. Opere complete. Volume primo, Isbn edizioni & exCogita, 2005. .
 L'antimeridiano. Opere complete. Volume secondo, Isbn edizioni & exCogita, 2007. .

Filmography
 La vita agra (1964) by Carlo Lizzani, with Ugo Tognazzi and Giovanna Ralli.
 Il merlo maschio (1971) by Pasquale Festa Campanile, with Lando Buzzanca and Laura Antonelli.

Bibliography
Irene Gambacorti, Luciano Bianciardi. Bibliografia (1948-1998), "Quaderni della Fondazione Luciano Bianciardi" 8, Florence, Studio Editoriale Fiorentino, 2001.

External links

Luciano Bianciardi's Translations

1922 births
1971 deaths
University of Pisa alumni
People from Grosseto
Italian librarians
Italian male journalists
Italian male short story writers
20th-century Italian translators
20th-century Italian novelists
20th-century Italian male writers
Italian male novelists
20th-century Italian short story writers
20th-century Italian journalists